"There Is a Light That Never Goes Out" is a song by the English rock band the Smiths, written by guitarist Johnny Marr and singer Morrissey. Featured on the band's third studio album The Queen Is Dead, it was not released as a single in the United Kingdom until 1992, five years after their split, to promote the compilation album ...Best II. It peaked at No. 25 on the UK Singles Chart and No. 22 on the Irish Singles Chart. The song has received considerable critical acclaim; in 2014, NME listed it as the 12th greatest song of all time. In 2021, it was ranked at No. 226 on Rolling Stone's "Top 500 Greatest Songs of All Time".

In 2005, Morrissey released a live version of the song as a double A-side with his cover of Patti Smith's "Redondo Beach", reaching No. 11 on the UK Singles Chart. In Ireland, the song was released alone and peaked at No. 45.

Origin and recording
The Smiths began working on "There Is a Light That Never Goes Out" during their late-1985 recording sessions at London's RAK Studios. In early September, the band recorded a rehearsal tape of the song performed in the key of F# minor. Four days later, the group made a monitor mix in the key of C# minor, this time accompanied by a synthesised string arrangement Marr created on an E-mu Emulator (credited to the "Hated Salford Ensemble" on the album release). While Morrissey was sceptical about using synthesised strings, the lack of a budget to hire a real string ensemble as well as the band's reluctance to allow outsiders into the recording process changed his mind.

The recording was completed in November at Jacobs Studios in Farnham, where Morrissey redid his vocal part twice and Marr added a flute melody. Marr later described the recording process of the song as "magical" and commented, "Someone told me that if you listen with the volume really, really up you can hear me shout 'That was amazing' right at the end."

Composition and lyrics

It was written in tandem with "Bigmouth Strikes Again". The two songs share the same key as well as similar chords. Simon Goddard noted both the guitar break in "Bigmouth Strikes Again" and the flute section in "There Is a Light That Never Goes Out" (originally written as a guitar part) are based on C# minor arpeggio figure. The song features an ascending F#m–A–B chord sequence that guitarist Johnny Marr took from the Rolling Stones cover of Marvin Gaye's "Hitch Hike". Marr said in 1993 he included the figure as an "in-joke" to determine if the music press would attribute the inspiration for the part to "There She Goes Again" by the Velvet Underground, who he contended "stole" the figure from "Hitch Hike". Marr commented, "I knew I was smarter than that. I was listening to what the Velvet Underground were listening to".

AllMusic's Tim DiGravina argues that, while depressed characters were a regular feature in Morrissey's work, his lyric on "There Is a Light That Never Goes Out" "ups the sad-and-doomed quotient by leaps and bounds." Goddard argues in his book Songs That Saved Your Life that the basic narrative story is similar to that of the James Dean film Rebel Without a Cause, in which Dean — an idol of Morrissey's — leaves his tortuous home life, being the passenger to a potential romantic partner. In fact, a line from that movie ("It is not my home") is alluded to in the song. According to Goddard, an earlier version lacked some of the finished version's ambiguity, culminating in the line "There is a light in your eyes and it never goes out".

Release
Due to a dispute between the Smiths and its record label Rough Trade Records after the group completed The Queen Is Dead, nine months passed after the release of "The Boy with the Thorn in His Side" before the group issued another single. Once the matter was resolved, Rough Trade owner Geoff Travis felt that "There Is a Light That Never Goes Out" should be the band's "comeback" record. Despite Travis's advocation of the song, Simon Goddard expressed doubt that the song's "explicit glamorisation of suicide" would have endeared it to daytime radio. Additionally, Johnny Marr was insistent that "Bigmouth Strikes Again" be the band's next single. Marr stated:

Morrissey affirmed Marr's position, commenting, "We did want 'Bigmouth Strikes Again'. I suppose it should have been followed by 'There Is a Light That Never Goes Out' but by then we'd written 'Panic' and we were very eager to have it thrown out into the pop wilderness."

Regardless, "There Is a Light That Never Goes Out" became the second Smiths song to top BBC Radio One disc jockey John Peel's Festive Fifty poll in his 1986 tally. The song was shortly thereafter included on the 1987 compilation album The World Won't Listen. On 12 October 1992, "There Is a Light That Never Goes Out" finally received a single release by WEA to promote the ...Best II compilation. The song reached number 25 on the UK Singles Chart, making it their last UK Top 40 appearance to date.

Reception

Music critics consider "There Is a Light That Never Goes Out" to be one of the Smiths' finest efforts. Simon Goddard wrote, "In a straw poll among Smiths fans today, 'There Is a Light That Never Goes Out' would more than likely still come out victorious", which he credits to the "perfect balance" of Marr's compositional skills and Morrissey's lyricism. AllMusic's Tim DiGravina calls it "a standout among standouts from the Smiths' masterpiece third album, The Queen Is Dead." In 2014, NME listed "There Is a Light That Never Goes Out" as the 12th greatest song of all time. The website Acclaimed Music lists it as the 49th most acclaimed song of all time, and the 6th most acclaimed song of the 1980s. In 2017, Rob Sheffield of Rolling Stone placed the song number one in his ranking of 73 songs by the Smiths.

Marr commented on the song's enduring popularity, "I didn't realise that 'There Is a Light That Never Goes Out' was going to be an anthem, but when we first played it, I thought it was the best song I'd ever heard."

Track listing
CD 1 (1992)
 "There Is a Light That Never Goes Out" – 4:02
 "Hand in Glove" (live) – 2:48
 "Some Girls Are Bigger Than Others" (live) – 5:03
 "Money Changes Everything" – 4:41

CD 2 (1992)
 "There Is a Light That Never Goes Out" – 4:02
 "Hand in Glove" (with Sandie Shaw) – 2:58
 "I Don't Owe You Anything" (with Sandie Shaw) – 4:06
 "Jeane" (with Sandie Shaw) – 2:52

7" and cassette single (1992)
 "There Is a Light That Never Goes Out" – 4:02
 "Handsome Devil" (live) – 2:55

7" (1987)
 "There Is a Light That Never Goes Out" – 4:02
 "Half a Person" – 3:36

Charts

The Smiths version

Morrissey version
All entries charted with "Redondo Beach".

Certifications

In popular culture
There is a chapter in Irvine Welsh's novel Trainspotting named after this song, which mentions its title directly. The song appears on the soundtrack to (500) Days of Summer; in the film, it is used to bring the main characters together.

The song has been covered by numerous artists including The Cranberries in 2012 on the French rock radio station Ouï FM and by rock band Speedstar in 2005 on Australian youth radio station Triple J. Neil Finn's project 7 Worlds Collide covered the song on their 2001 self-titled album. It was also covered by Noel Gallagher during an acoustic performance with Gem Archer. In 2000 electronic musicians Schneider TM and KPT.michi.gan released a cover of the song, retitled "The Light 3000", on their EP Binokular.

References

External links

1986 songs
1992 singles
2005 singles
Rock ballads
1980s ballads
Morrissey songs
The Smiths songs
Songs written by Morrissey
Songs written by Johnny Marr
Warner Music Group singles
UK Independent Singles Chart number-one singles